Piers Frederick Alexander Flint-Shipman (23 January 1962 – 2 June 1984) was a 20th-century English actor.

Early life
He was the son of film producer Gerald Flint-Shipman, and received his formal education at Ampleforth College.

Career
Along with theatrical appearances he also performed in several television series and cinema films from the mid-1970's. He sometimes used the stage name Frederick Alexander, his middle two names.

Death
Flint-Shipman was killed in his 23rd year in a road traffic collision in France, when his car was hit by another driver intent upon suicide.

Personal life
He was the brother of the painter Andrew Flint-Shipman, and was a friend of the actor Rupert Everett.

Filmography 
 Fall of Eagles (1974)
 The Flight Fund (1975) (TV)
 Love Among the Artists (1979)
 To Serve Them All My Days (1980)
 Country: A Tory Story (1981) (TV)
 Floating Off (1983) (TV)
 Good and Bad at Games (1983) (TV)
 Another Country (1984)

References

External links

1962 births
1984 deaths
English male child actors
English male television actors
English male stage actors
Road incident deaths in France
20th-century English male actors
Place of birth missing
People educated at Ampleforth College